Gabriele Varriale was an Italian film editor and assistant director active between 1935 and 1962. He also co-directed the 1941 comedy Idyll in Budapest.

Selected filmography
 We Were Seven Sisters (1939)
 Then We'll Get a Divorce (1940)
 Scampolo (1941)
 A Woman Has Fallen (1941)
 Idyll in Budapest (1941)
 After Casanova's Fashion (1942)
 Torrents of Spring (1942)
 Music on the Run (1943)
 The Adulteress (1946)
 The Sun Still Rises (1946)
 The White Devil (1947)
 Bitter Rice (1949)
 The Devil in the Convent (1950)
 Anna (1951)
 Four Red Roses (1951)
 Rome 11:00 (1952)
 Finishing School (1953)
 Angels of Darkness (1954)
 Sunset in Naples (1955)
 The Prince with the Red Mask (1955)
 Le ambiziose (1961)
 Constantine and the Cross (1961)

References

Bibliography
 Roberto Chiti & Roberto Poppi. I film: Tutti i film italiani dal 1930 al 1944. Gremese Editore, 2005.

External links

Year of birth unknown
Year of death unknown
Italian film editors